The 1300th Anniversary of the Bulgarian State was a yearlong celebration in 1981 when Bulgaria celebrated the 1300th anniversary of the establishment of the first Bulgarian state in modern history. There were 23,000 events connected with the 1300th anniversary.

Things made in honour of the anniversary

Monuments 
 Monument to 1300 Years of Bulgaria, Shumen
 Monument to the Unknown Soldier, Sofia
 Buzludzha Monument

Buildings 
 National Palace of Culture

Films 
 Aszparuh

Others 
 Bulgaria 1300
 Encyclopedia Bulgaria

Events 
 Bulgarian Cup

The military parade 
The parade took place on Sofia's September 9th Square. The parade inspector was the Minister of People's Defence of Bulgaria, General of the Army Dobri Dzhurov. The parade commander was Colonel General Hristo Dobrev, the Commander of the Land Forces of the Bulgarian People's Army. Attending the parade was the General Secretary of the Bulgarian Communist Party Todor Zhivkov.

Full order of the march past 
 Drummers and Buglers of the Georgi Atanasov Military Music School
 Cadets of Military Colleges 
Georgi Rakovski Military Academy 
"Vasil Levski" People's Higher Combined Arms School 
 Georgi Dimitrov National Military Artillery School
People's Higher Naval School "Nikola Vaptsarov"
 Motor Riflemen
 BNA Airborne Troops
 BNA Marines
Border Guards 
 Militiamen of the Bulgarian Ministry of Internal Affairs
Other units present included: the National Guards Unit of Bulgaria and the Central Brass Band of the Bulgarian People's Army.

Commemorative coins and awards 
At least 20 commemorative coins were made in 1981 honoring the anniversary. An award, the Order "13 Centuries of Bulgaria", and a medal, Medal "1300th Anniversary of Bulgaria" were issued on October 16, 1981 in honor of the anniversary.

See also 
 People's Republic of Bulgaria
 History of Bulgaria

References 

Military parades
Parades in Bulgaria
Historiography of Bulgaria
Anniversaries
1981 in Bulgaria